China–Brazil Earth Resources Satellite 2B (CBERS-2B), also known as Ziyuan 1-2B, was a remote sensing satellite operated as part of the China–Brazil Earth Resources Satellite program between the Chinese Center for Resources Satellite Data and Application and Brazilian National Institute for Space Research. The third CBERS satellite to fly, it was launched by China in 2007 to replace CBERS-2.

Spacecraft 
CBERS-2B was a  spacecraft built by the China Academy of Space Technology and based on the Phoenix-Eye 1 satellite bus. The spacecraft was powered by a single solar array, which provided 1100 watts of electricity for the satellite's systems. The 1.8 m x 2.0 m x 2.2 m, triaxially-stabilized spacecraft carries a low 20 m resolution, and a higher 2.5 m resolution camera. The data help in crop estimation, urban planning, water resource management, and military intelligence.

The instrument suite aboard the CBERS-2B spacecraft consisted of three systems:

The HRC replaced the lower-resolution Infrared Multispectral Scanner instrument flown on earlier CBERS satellites.

Launch 
A Long March 4B carrier rocket, operated by the China Academy of Launch Vehicle Technology (CALT), was used to launch CBERS-2B. The launch took place at 03:26:13 UTC on 19 September 2007, using Launch Complex 7 at the Taiyuan Satellite Launch Center (TLSC). The satellite was successfully placed into a sun-synchronous orbit.

Last contact 
The CBERS-2B spacecraft suffered a power system failure on 10 May 2010, leaving it unable to continue operations. It remains in orbit.

References 

Spacecraft launched in 2007
China–Brazil Earth Resources Satellite program
Derelict satellites orbiting Earth
Earth observation satellites of Brazil
Satellites of China
2007 in China
Spacecraft launched by Long March rockets